The Northeast-10 Conference men's basketball tournament is the annual conference basketball championship tournament for the Northeast-10 Conference. The tournament has been held annually since 1981. It is a single-elimination tournament and seeding is based on regular season records.

The winner, declared conference champion, receives the conference's automatic bid to the NCAA Men's Division II Basketball Championship.

Results

Championship records

 Schools highlighted in pink are former members of the Northeast-10 Conference

See also
 Northeast-10 Conference women's basketball tournament

References

NCAA Division II men's basketball conference tournaments
Tournament
Recurring sporting events established in 1981